Eric Patrick is an independent filmmaker, freelance animator, Guggenheim fellow, musician, and educator. He is currently a tenured professor in the Radio-TV-Film program at Northwestern University.

Originally from Port Arthur, Texas, he played in a band throughout the Southern United States before he studied art and film at the University of New Mexico in Albuquerque. He completed his MFA in experimental animation at California Institute of the Arts (1997).

Films
Patrick's films focus on low-tech, traditional, film-based techniques to explore ideas of consciousness and decay. According to the Southern Arts Federation, his films are "filled with eerily beautiful visuals that evoke a surreal, otherworldly feel which is complemented by the absence of a traditional narrative." He has been awarded grants from the John Simon Guggenheim Memorial Foundation, the Texas Filmmakers’ Production Fund, and The Rooftop Film Fund.

His films have won awards at The Black Maria Film Festival, The Humboldt International Film Festival, Semana de Cine Experimental de Madrid, South by Southwest Film Festival (SXSW), The Ann Arbor Film Festival, U.S.A. Film Festival, Big Muddy Film Festival, and Festival de Cinema Independent de Barcelona.

His filmwork includes Stark Film (1997), Ablution (2001), and Startle Pattern (2005).

Animation
Patrick has also worked as a commercial animator, most prominently for the Nickelodeon program Blue's Clues. He has taught film and animation production at the University of Texas Austin, University of North Carolina Greensboro, and Northwestern University.  His writing on animated documentaries and on ritual in animation have appeared in Animac journal.

References

External links 
 Eric Patrick at Canyon Cinema
 

American experimental filmmakers
American animated film directors
Animators from Texas
Living people
Film theorists
Stop motion animators
Animation educators
People from Port Arthur, Texas
People from Evanston, Illinois
Clear Lake High School (Houston, Texas) alumni
University of New Mexico alumni
Northwestern University faculty
Film directors from Illinois
Film directors from Texas
Year of birth missing (living people)